Hanborough is a civil parish in West Oxfordshire. The parish includes the villages of Church Hanborough (Ordnance Survey grid reference SP4212) and Long Hanborough (OS grid ref. SP4114). The village of Freeland was transferred from Eynsham civil parish to Hanborough in 1932 and then detached to form a separate civil parish in 1948. Both Church Hanborough and Long Hanborough are served by Hanborough railway station.

Sources

References

Civil parishes in Oxfordshire
West Oxfordshire District